Devarajan Varadarajan (Dev) (born 23 May 1980) is a Singaporean actor, singer and director of Tamil descent.

Career 
In 2005, Devarajan took part in Vasantham Star, a Tamil language competition like American Idol  He finished the competition among the top ten finalists that year. In 2007, Devarajan took part in Vasantham Star again, and finished the competition 2nd runner up. Devarajan then went on to act, sing and present television programmes for Mediacorp Vasantham.

In 2010, Devarajan auditioned for the role of "Dynesh" in Mediacorp Channel 5's Point of Entry and landed the role.  In 2012, Devarajan won the Best Supporting Actor at the Asian Television Awards for playing "Dynesh" in Point of Entry Season 2. Devarajan is one of three characters retained for the entire run of the series.

In 2013, Devarajan started writing screenplays and directing. He wrote and directed his first few short films, "Emily", Soeurs and Time's Up. He also wrote and directed a two-hour Malay language film in 2015 titled Nur Ainun. It was telecast on Mediacorp Suria and was of their highest rated tele-films to date. Devarajan has also co-written a script titled "Broken and Entered" which is currently in pre production in the United States.

Awards 
2012 - Highly Commended Best Supporting Actor (Asian Television Awards)

References

21st-century Singaporean male actors
21st-century Singaporean male singers
Singaporean film directors
Singaporean screenwriters
Living people
1980 births
Singaporean male television actors